Purnamasi Jani (born 1944) also known as Tadisaru Bai is a poet, social activist from Odisha. She has composed over 50,000 devotional songs in Kui, Odia and Sanskrit. In 2021, she was awarded Padma Shri by the Indian Government.

Personal life
Jani was born 1944 in Charipada village under Khajuripada block of Kandhamal district.

Awards
 Odisha Sahitya Academy award for poetry in 2006
 South Odisha literature award in 2008
 Padma Shri in 2021

References

Recipients of the Padma Shri in social work
Social workers
Social workers from Odisha
1944 births
Living people